Aditya Chaudhary (born 19 April 1996) is a footballer from Nepal. He made his first appearance for the Nepal national football team on 31 October 2014.

Club career

Three Star Club
After witnessing his impressive performances for the Nepalese under 17 team Chaudhary was signed by Nepalese heavyweights Three Star Club. Three Star manager Ram Shrestha confirmed that the young defender had signed a one-year deal with the club. "Aditya Choudhary is a very good player and we feel happy to snap him for new season." Shretha told reporters "He impressed us with his defensive skills during SAFF U-16 Championship last year, we are sure he can excel his career in Mega Three Star Club." Chaudhary too was highly pleased with his new team, saying "I am happy to sign a contract with Mega Three Star, my first target is to be in the first eleven and perform my best for the team." Choudhary was set to earn a salary of 18,000 rupees per month.

Nepal APF
In 2015 Choudhary signed with Nepal APF. In February 2015 in a Rara Gold Cup match Choudhary was sent off and nine other players were yellow carded as APF surprisingly lost 1-0 to Far Western FC. Choudhary had a poor game, earlier in the same match he had a penalty kick saved by Birendra Bahadur Chand in the 18th minute.

International career

U-19 Career
In October 2013 Chaudhary was called up for the 2014 AFC U-19 Championship qualification in Doha. Nepal failed to register a point as they lost all four matches.

U-23 Career
In August 2014 Chaudhary was selected for a two-part friendly matches against Bangladesh. His performance in the next match was strongly applauded.

Senior career
Chaudhary made his international debut for Nepal on 31 October 2014 coming on for Bhola Silwal in the 83rd minute. Chaudhary had a great chance to equalize at 1-0 down but shot straight at the goalkeeper, and latter conceded the Penalty kick which led to the second goal in an eventual 3-0 loss against the Philippines.

References

External links
 

1996 births
Living people
Nepalese footballers
Nepal international footballers
Association football defenders
Footballers at the 2014 Asian Games
Three Star Club players
Footballers at the 2018 Asian Games
Asian Games competitors for Nepal